In the 1948 season, Somerset County Cricket Club competed in the County Championship, finishing twelfth out of seventeen teams. They were officially captained by three amateurs through the season; initially by Mandy Mitchell-Innes; then by Jake Seamer; and finally by George Woodhouse. The strains on consistent leadership were reflected in Somerset's variable form: after failing to win their first eight matches. Somerset did not win, lose or draw twice in consecutive matches in their following eight matches. In all, they won five times that season, and depended heavily upon the batting of Harold Gimblett, who scored 1,741 runs, and was Somerset's only player to score a century.

Other than Gimblett, only two Somerset batsmen scored over 1,000 runs in the County Championship, Bertie Buse and Miles Coope, but both players did so at a significantly lower average. The team's bowling was led Horace Hazell, who claimed 92 wickets in the Championship. Maurice Tremlett, who had been highly praised for his performance on debut in 1947 continued to show promise, scoring over 1,000 first-class runs in all first-class matches and claiming 86 wickets, positioning himself as the county's leading all-rounder.

Background
County cricket had sojourned during the Second World War, and only returned in 1946. Most of the players had seen war service in some form or another, and very few of them had played much cricket of any form, which resulted in a temporary drop in quality. As most of the players were the same as those from before the war, it also meant that the average age of a county cricketer was higher than usual. The social change that was occurring all around Great Britain also had an effect on county cricket, and at Somerset it resulted in their professional players gathering together to ask for better playing conditions and greater pay. Despite these changes, and the relative weakness of amateur players in comparison to the professionals, Somerset, as like many other counties, insisted on naming amateurs as captains. In 1946, Bunty Longrigg, who had captained Somerset before the war had resumed his duties, but he retired at the end of the season as was replaced by Jack Meyer for 1947. Meyer had reluctantly agreed to captain the side in the absence of any other candidates, but stepped down at the end of his single season, citing his fading eyesight and lumbago.

As a result of Meyer's resignation, the Somerset committee was once more required to recruit a captain for the following season. Still limiting themselves by requiring an amateur to take on the role—Somerset would not appoint a professional captain until 1956— the committee found that there was no player "of a suitable pedigree who could make himself available for the whole summer." So, with no single candidate suitable, the Somerset committee announced that the club would be captained by three players; first by Mandy Mitchell-Innes and then by Jake Seamer during their respective periods of leave from the Sudan Political Service. Once both of these had returned to their duties, George Woodhouse would take over. In his history of Somerset County Cricket Club, Peter Roebuck describes the situation as a "remarkable state of affairs", while David Foot suggests that the true number of captains was closer to seven.

Squad
The following players made at least one appearance for Somerset in first-class matches.  Age given is at the start of Somerset's first match of the season (5 May 1948).

Key
  denotes that the player appeared as a wicket-keeper for Somerset in 1948
 Apps denotes the number of appearances made by the player for Somerset in 1948
 Ref denotes the reference for the player details

County Championship

Season standings
Note: Pld = Played, W = Wins, L = Losses, LWF = Lost but won on 1st innings, DW1 = Won on 1st innings in drawn match played under 1-day rules, DL1 = Lost on 1st innings in drawn match played under 1-day rules, DWF = Won on 1st innings in drawn match, DLF = Lost on 1st innings in drawn match, ND = No Decision on 1st innings, Pts = Points, (C) = Champions.

Match log

Batting averages

Bowling averages

Other first-class

Match log

References

Bibliography

Somerset County Cricket Club seasons
1948 in English cricket